The 1979 Calder Cup playoffs of the American Hockey League began on April 11, 1979. The top three teams from each division qualified for the playoffs. The two division winners earned byes for the Division Semifinals while the other two teams in each division played best-of-five series. The winners played best-of-seven series with the team that received the first round bye in their division. The winners of each Division Final played a best-of-seven series for the Calder Cup.  The Calder Cup Final ended on May 11, 1979, with the Maine Mariners defeating the New Haven Nighthawks four games to zero to win the Calder Cup for the second consecutive year, and the third time in team history. Maine also beat new Haven in the 1978 Calder Cup Final.

In game three of the Southern division final, New Haven scored 15 goals against Binghamton to set an AHL record for most goals scored by one team in one playoff game.

Playoff seeds
After the 1978–79 AHL regular season, the top three teams from each division qualified for the playoffs. The Maine Mariners finished the regular season with the best overall record for the second consecutive year. The two division champions earned byes to the Division Finals.

Northern Division
Maine Mariners - 103 points
New Brunswick Hawks - 92 points
Nova Scotia Voyageurs - 82 points

Southern Division
New Haven Nighthawks - 101 points
Hershey Bears - 78 points
Binghamton Dusters - 69 points

Bracket

In each round, the team that earned more points during the regular season receives home ice advantage, meaning they receive the "extra" game on home-ice if the series reaches the maximum number of games. There is no set series format due to arena scheduling conflicts and travel considerations.

Division Semifinals 
Note: Home team is listed first.

Byes
Maine Mariners (Northern Division regular-season champions)
New Haven Nighthawks (Southern Division regular-season champions)

Northern Division

(2) New Brunswick Hawks vs. (3) Nova Scotia Voyageurs

Southern Division

(2) Hershey Bears vs. (3) Binghamton Dusters

Division Finals

Northern Division

(1) Maine Mariners vs. (3) Nova Scotia Voyageurs

Southern Division

(1) New Haven Nighthawks vs. (3) Binghamton Dusters

Calder Cup Final

(N1) Maine Mariners vs. (S1) New Haven Nighthawks

See also
1978–79 AHL season
List of AHL seasons

References

Calder Cup
Calder Cup playoffs